Alexander Morozov (born 22 March 1974, Lugansk, Ukrainian SSR) is a Russian artist based in St. Petersburg, Russia.

Life 
He studied at the Painting Department of St.Petersburg Academy of Arts (1996–2002).

From 1999–2000 — he enrolled in the Educational program in Pro Arte Institute ‘Practicum. New Technology in Contemporary Art’ under Alexey Shulgin.

He creates works of paintings, graphics, sculpture and installations. He was nominated for the Artaward International Strabag (2013) and the Sergey Kuryokhin Award (2013).

Solo exhibitions
2014 — ‘What Do You See?’, Art re. Flex Gallery, St Petersburg, Russia
2014 — ‘Garden’, Book Graphics Library, St Petersburg, Russia
2012 — ‘Factum’, Luda Express gallery in ‘New Holland’ open air art space, St Petersburg, Russia
2012 — ‘The Human Factor’, with Alexander Artemov, Algallery, St Petersburg, Russia
2012 — ‘Cinderella Effect’, Navicula Artis Gallery, St Petersburg, Russia
2010 — ‘Radiation’, Navicula Artis gallery, St Petersburg, Russia
2009 — ‘The Classical Garden of German Romanticism’, Botanical Museum, St Petersburg, Russia

Selected group exhibitions
2014 — ‘Cementa’, Borey Gallery, St Petersburg, Russia
2014 — ‘The Other Capital’, Museum of Moscow, Moscow, Russia
2014 — ‘Black Envy’ in a Parallel Events of the Manifesta 10, Borey Gallery, St Petersburg, Russia
2014 — ‘Kommunal Ghetto’ as a part of ‘Apartment Art as Domestic Resistance’ exhibition Public programs Manifesta 10, St Petersburg, Russia
2014 — ‘Signal’, ‘KB Signal’, St Petersburg, Russia
2014 — ‘Saving Venice’, Gisich Gallery, St Petersburg, Russia
2014 — ‘Perceiving Art’, St Petersburg State Library for the Blind, St Petersburg, Russia
2014 — ‘Drunk Exhibition to the Centenary of Russian Аvant-garde’, Borey Gallery, St Petersburg, Russia
2013 — The 11th Baltic States Biennale of Graphic Art ‘Kaliningrad–Konigsberg 2013’. The Kaliningrad State Art Gallery. Kaliningrad, Russia
2013 — Art Prospect Festival, St Petersburg, Russia
2013 — V Biennale ‘New ideas for the city.’ The Garden City. Green urbanism, The Museum of Urban Sculpture. St Petersburg, Russia 
2013 — Season of St Petersburg Art. Navicula Artis. ‘Found in St Petersburg’. Kultproekt gallery, Moscow, Russia
2012 — Baltic Biennale 2012, Rizzordi Art Foundation, St Petersburg, Russia 
2012 — Nel Modo Russico, Ten 43 gallery, NY, USA
2012 — ‘Conversion’, art-quarter ‘Quarter’, St Petersburg, Russia
2012 — ‘10−9’, 3H+K gallery, Pori, Finland
2001 — ‘Microfest 01 Pro’, Pro Arte Institute, St Petersburg, Russia
1999 — ‘Divietodisosta’. Artezero gallery, Milan, Italy
1999 — ‘Faces of the Holy’, New Academy of Fine Arts gallery, St Petersburg, Russia

Gallery

Collections
Works are represented in state and private collections.

References

External links
Alexander Morozov on issuu.com
 

Living people
1974 births
21st-century Russian painters
Russian male painters
Russian contemporary artists
Painters from Saint Petersburg
Repin Institute of Arts alumni
21st-century Russian male artists